The 1897 Cincinnati football team was an American football team that represented the University of Cincinnati as an independent during the 1897 college football season. In their first season under head coach Tom Fennell, the Bearcats compiled a 9–1–1 record. William Bass was the team captain. The team played its home games at Union Ball Park in Cincinnati.

Following their regular season schedule, which they completed with a record of 7–1–1, losing only to the Carlisle Indians, Cincinnati played two post-season games in New Orleans. The Bearcats were invited to New Orleans by the Southern Athletic Club to play a football game on New Year's Day. Cincinnati easily defeated the Athletic Club team, and at the victory party following the win, students from nearby Louisiana State University (LSU) invited the Cincinnati players to come to their school to play another game. The Cincinnati–LSU game, which took place a few days later and pre-dated the first Rose Bowl Game by five years, resulted in a 28–0 (exact score varies by source) Cincinnati win. This game could be considered, the school's athletic department contemplates, as the first bowl game in Cincinnati football history.

Schedule

References

Cincinnati
Cincinnati Bearcats football seasons
Cincinnati football